Jolly Green Giant is a mascot of the Green Giant vegetable company.

It may also refer to:
 The Sikorsky S-61R, a 1959 helicopter
 The Sikorsky CH-53 Sea Stallion, a 1966 helicopter
 The Sikorsky MH-53, a 1967 USAF helicopter
 "The Jolly Green Giant", a 1965 hit by The Kingsmen

See also

 The Jolly Giant, a defunct chain of large toy shops in the United Kingdom